This is the discography of eLDee, a Nigerian rapper. He has released four studio albums and twenty-one singles.

Albums

Studio

Other albums

As lead artist

As guest artist

Eldee
Hip hop discographies